Indomitable Lions is the name given to most of the national sporting teams of the African nation of Cameroon. These include:

Cameroon national football team
Cameroon national futsal team
Cameroon national rugby league team
Cameroon national rugby union team
Cameroon national under-23 football team